Kenyatta Lee Frazier Jr. (born April 11, 2000), known professionally as Ken Carson (formerly stylized as Ken Car$on) is an American rapper, singer, songwriter, and record producer. He is known for his studio album X which peaked at number 115 on the Billboard 200 and for being signed to Opium, the record label belonging to Playboi Carti.

Career

2015–2019: beginnings
Frazier initially joined 808 Mafia in 2015 as a rapper after meeting uncle and fellow record producer TM88, and would begin releasing music on SoundCloud as early as 2017. After gaining popularity in the underground rap scene, he would be discovered by fellow Atlanta rapper Playboi Carti and signed to his label Opium in 2019.

2020–present: Boy Barbie, Teen X, Project X  and X

After signing to Opium in 2019, Frazier would release two extended plays in 2020, Boy Barbie and Teen X. At the start of 2021, he would release a sequel EP called Teen X: Relapsed, before releasing his debut studio album Project X later that year. In February 2022, he appeared as a guest on the track "Geek High" off American rapper Yeat's album, 2 Alive. He released his second studio album X on July 8, 2022. It peaked at number 115 on the Billboard 200. In October 2022, he and fellow Atlanta rapper SoFaygo released a single titled "Hell Yeah" for SoFaygo's album Pink Heartz with an accompanying music video. On October 31, 2022, Ken Carson released a deluxe version of his X album named Xtended, alongside a music video on YouTube for his song "MDMA" featuring Destroy Lonely. On January 13, 2023, he would release the music video for his song "Freestyle 2" on YouTube. Shortly after, on February 14, he would release his single "i need u".

Musical style
Ken Carson's musical style on his studio album has been described as "[having] electronic production that is energetic in nature," with Ken having "focused" flows and being "intent on making his audience get up from their seats." He has been compared to his mentor Playboi Carti and his 2020 album Whole Lotta Red.

Discography

Studio albums

Mixtapes

Extended plays

References 

Living people
21st-century American rappers
African-American male rappers
African-American male singer-songwriters
American hip hop singers
Interscope Records artists
Rappers from Atlanta
Rappers from Georgia (U.S. state)
Record producers from Georgia (U.S. state)
Singer-songwriters from Georgia (U.S. state)
Southern hip hop musicians
Trap musicians
2000 births